Allan Anthony Fife  (born October 1954) is an Australian business man noted for his property investment acumen. In 2017 Fife received the Medal of the Order of Australia for service to aged welfare, to business, and to the property sector.

References

Recipients of the Medal of the Order of Australia
1954 births
Macquarie University alumni
Western Sydney University alumni
People educated at Canberra Grammar School
People from Wagga Wagga
Australian business executives
Living people